457 may refer to:
The year AD 457 in the Western calendar
The number 457
The 457 plan, a retirement plan available to government and nonprofit employees in the United States similar to the 401(k)
The 457 visa, the most commonly used program for employers to sponsor overseas workers to work in Australia on a temporary basis.
The Smith & Wesson Model 457, a pistol.